The Redwing know more commonly as the Bembridge Redwing is a keelboat originally designed by Charles Ernest Nicholson in 1896 and first raced in 1897. In 1937 the class was redesigned by Nicholson to create the 1938 Redwing that can be seen racing both outside Bembridge Harbour and in Poole Harbour on the south of England. The class is a one design hull with a development rig where the rules specify a maximum sail area of 200 sq. ft. with only a few constraints.

First design

References

External links
Bembridge Sailing Club

Keelboats
Sailing yachts designed by Charles Ernest Nicholson
Sailing yachts built in the United Kingdom
Sailing yachts of the United Kingdom
1900s sailboat type designs
1930s sailboat type designs
One-design sailing classes